The Existence of Chance Is Everything and Nothing While the Greatest Achievement Is the Living of Life, and so Say ALL OF US, or simply All of Us, is the second studio album released by the British psychedelic rock band Nirvana. The album was released in 1968.

It includes "Tiny Goddess," "Trapeze," and "Frankie the Great". The album's most well-known song, "Rainbow Chaser," leads off, with its prominent phasing effects; "Tiny Goddess," a ballad, comes next. "Rainbow Chaser" was a #1 single in Denmark in April 1969, where it stayed in the top 10 for a month. "Rainbow Chaser" was to be their only UK top 40 hit.

The cover shot is a monochrome reproduction of Les Conquérants (The Conquerors) painted in 1892 by Pierre Fritel, and depicts some of world history's most famous figures leading a procession through a mass of dead bodies.

Track listing
All songs written by Patrick Campbell-Lyons and Alex Spyropolous.

Side one
 "Rainbow Chaser" – 2:38
 "Tiny Goddess" – 4:03
 "The Touchables (All of Us)" – 2:59
 "Melanie Blue" – 2:40
 "Trapeze" – 2:49
 "The Show Must Go On" – 2:40

Side two
 "Girl in the Park" – 2:41
 "Miami Masquerade" – 2:48
 "Frankie the Great" – 2:29
 "You Can Try It" – 3:18
 "Everybody Loves the Clown" - 2:00
 "St. John's Wood Affair" - 4:18

The 2003 Universal Island Remasters collection features 16 tracks including four b-sides as bonus tracks:
 "Flashbulb" (single b-side)
 "Oh! What a Performance" (single b-side)
 "Darling Darlene" (single b-side)
 "C Side of Ocho Rios" (single b-side)

Personnel
Patrick Campbell-Lyons – guitar & vocals
Ray Singer – guitar & vocals
Alex Spyropoulos – piano & keyboards

Production notes
Brian Humphries – engineer, producer
Gered Mankowitz – photography

References

Nirvana (British band) albums
1968 albums
Island Records albums
Albums produced by Chris Blackwell